Ash'ari is the foremost theological school of Sunni Islam.

Ash'ari or Ashari or Ashaari may also refer to:
 Abu Musa al-Ash'ari was a companion of the Prophet Muhammad.
 Al-Ash'ari was an Arab Sunni Muslim scholastic theologian.
 Ashari Danoe is an Indonesian footballer.
 Ashari Danudirdjo is an Indonesian sailor.
 Ashari Samsudin is a Malaysian footballer.
 Awal Ashaari is a Malaysian actor.
 Firhan Ashari is a Malaysian field hockey player.